The 2009 Schleswig-Holstein state election was held on 27 September 2009 to elect the members of the Landtag of Schleswig-Holstein. It was held on the same day as the 2009 federal election and the 2009 Brandenburg state election.

The election was triggered by the collapse of the grand coalition between the Christian Democratic Union (CDU) and Social Democratic Party (SPD) throughout summer 2009. The election saw major losses for the parties of the grand coalition, while the Free Democratic Party (FDP), The Greens, The Left, and the South Schleswig Voters' Association (SSW) made gains.

After the election, the CDU and FDP formed a coalition government. Minister-President Peter Harry Carstensen was re-elected as Minister-President.

Background
After the 2005 state election, the CDU won a narrow victory, securing 30 seats to the SPD's 29. However, neither the conventional CDU–FDP or SPD–Green blocs held a majority; the SSW held balance of power. The SPD attempted to form a government with the Greens and the support of the SSW, which held a one-seat majority. However, this unexpectedly failed in the Landtag. Subsequently, the CDU formed a grand coalition with the SPD.

Ralf Stegner became leader of the Schleswig-Holstein SPD in March 2007, after which point the relationship between the parties of government began to deteriorate. His criticism of the CDU led them to demand he resign as Minister of the Interior, which he did in January 2008. In September of the same year he was chosen as the SPD's lead candidate for the next state election, which was expected to take place in 2010.

Throughout 2009, the government's management of the Hamburg Commercial Bank crisis was a point of contention within the coalition. In June, it risked collapse as the SPD refused to approve deep cuts to public spending to support the bank. Ultimately the breakup was averted, as the parties came to an agreement. In July, Minister-President Carstensen and the CDU stated that the controversial bonus payments made to the CEO of the Hamburg Commercial Bank had been approved by the SPD, which the SPD denied.

On 15 July, the CDU announced it would end the coalition with the SPD and request the dissolution of the Landtag. The SPD unanimously rejected this in the Landtag in 20 July, causing the vote to fail. The next day, Minister-President Carstensen dismissed all members of the SPD from cabinet and called a motion of confidence in the Landtag on 23 July; the government was defeated, allowing Carstensen to call new elections.

Parties
The table below lists parties represented in the previous Landtag of Schleswig-Holstein.

Opinion polling

Election result

|-
| colspan=8| 
|-
! colspan="2" | Party
! Votes
! %
! +/-
! Seats 
! +/-
! Seats %
|-
| bgcolor=| 
| align=left | Christian Democratic Union (CDU)
| align=right| 505,612
| align=right| 31.5
| align=right| 8.7
| align=right| 34
| align=right| 4
| align=right| 35.8
|-
| bgcolor=| 
| align=left | Social Democratic Party (SPD)
| align=right| 407,643
| align=right| 25.4
| align=right| 13.3
| align=right| 25
| align=right| 4
| align=right| 26.3
|-
| bgcolor=| 
| align=left | Free Democratic Party (FDP)
| align=right| 239,338
| align=right| 14.9
| align=right| 8.3
| align=right| 14
| align=right| 10
| align=right| 14.7
|-
| bgcolor=| 
| align=left | Alliance 90/The Greens (Grüne)
| align=right| 199,367
| align=right| 12.4
| align=right| 6.2
| align=right| 12
| align=right| 8
| align=right| 12.6
|-
| bgcolor=| 
| align=left | The Left (Linke)
| align=right| 95,764
| align=right| 6.0
| align=right| 5.8
| align=right| 6
| align=right| 6
| align=right| 6.3
|-
| bgcolor=| 
| align=left | South Schleswig Voters' Association (SSW)
| align=right| 69,701
| align=right| 4.3
| align=right| 0.7
| align=right| 4
| align=right| 2
| align=right| 4.2
|-
! colspan=8|
|-
| bgcolor=| 
| align=left | Pirate Party Germany (Piraten)
| align=right| 28,837
| align=right| 1.8
| align=right| New
| align=right| 0
| align=right| New
| align=right| 0
|-
| bgcolor=| 
| align=left | Free Voters (FW)
| align=right| 16,362
| align=right| 1.0
| align=right| 1.0
| align=right| 0
| align=right| ±0
| align=right| 0
|-
| bgcolor=|
| align=left | Others
| align=right| 40,782
| align=right| 2.5
| align=right| 
| align=right| 0
| align=right| ±0
| align=right| 0
|-
! align=right colspan=2| Total
! align=right| 1,603,406
! align=right| 100.0
! align=right| 
! align=right| 95
! align=right| 26
! align=right| 
|-
! align=right colspan=2| Voter turnout
! align=right| 
! align=right| 73.6
! align=right| 7.1
! align=right| 
! align=right| 
! align=right| 
|}

Outcome
The CDU and FDP won a narrow majority of 49 seats (later revised to 48). The CDU therefore chose to enter government with them rather than seek a new grand coalition with the SPD.

Recount in Husum III
The initial result of the election stated that the FDP won 15 seats and The Left won 5. In January 2010, The Left requested a recount of ballots in the Husum III constituency, which found that The Left had won 41 list votes, rather than the 9 originally reported. The results were recalculated and The Left was determined to have won one additional seat for a total of six, with the FDP losing its 15th seat. This reduced the size of the CDU–FDP government from 49 to 48, a narrow majority of one seat.

Legal challenge against the election result
After the election, a dispute arose regarding the electoral law. In Schleswig-Holstein, the standard size of the Landtag is 69 seats, of which 40 are single-member "direct mandates", and the remaining 29 are distributed based on compensatory proportional representation. German electoral law conventionally seeks to create overall proportionality in legislatures; ie, the ratio of seats distributed between each party should, as closely as possible, match the ratio of votes won between each party.

In the 2009 election, the CDU won a large majority of the 40 direct mandates, meaning it held 11 more seats than was proportional in the 69-seat Landtag. The Schleswig-Holstein electoral law contains provisions to allocate leveling seats in this situation. However, the wording of the electoral law was ambiguous, making it unclear whether 14 or 20 leveling seats should be added. On 16 October, the state returning officer stated that 14 seats should be added. The members of the electoral commission (the state returning officer and six party representatives) subsequently voted on this proposal, with 3 voting in favour, 2 against, and 2 abstentions. The returning officer, CDU, and FDP representatives voted in favour.

The size of the Landtag was therefore set to 95 seats. This left the CDU and FDP with 49 seats (a two-seat majority) while the SPD, Greens, Left, and SSW held 46 seats between them. This was despite the fact that the CDU and FDP had together won 744,950 votes (46.5%), fewer than the other four parties, which together won 772,475 (48.2%). This was because 14 leveling seats were not sufficient to create true proportionality, and the CDU was still overrepresented in the Landtag. If the electoral commission had allocated 20 leveling seats rather than 14, proportionality would have been achieved, and the CDU and FDP would have held 50 out of 101 seats, just short of a majority.

The Greens and SSW sought a legal challenge to the disproportionate result; The Left joined this challenge after the sitting of the new Landtag. The case was heard by the Constitutional Court of Schleswig-Holstein on 28 June 2010. The verdict, announced on 30 August, was that the electoral law was unconstitutional. The court ruled that the law must be changed by 31 May 2011, and a new state election held no later than 30 September 2012. However, the result from the 2009 election was allowed to stand, so the government continued with its majority intact.

A new electoral law was passed by the Landtag on 25 March 2011, and on 7 June, the election date was set for 6 May 2012.

Notes

References

2009 elections in Germany
Elections in Schleswig-Holstein
September 2009 events in Europe